Hot Line (subtitled The Tenor of Bill Barron) is an album by saxophonist Bill Barron which was recorded in 1962 and first released on the Savoy label. The album was also rereleased as The Hot Line under Booker Ervin's co-leadership.

Reception 

In his review on Allmusic, Scott Yanow called it a "fine release" stating "Barron's five advanced originals alternate with three standards that give the two tenors an opportunity to display their contrasting but complementary inside/outside styles"

Track listing 
All compositions by Bill Barron except where noted.
 "Bill's Boogie" – 6:50
 "Groovin'" – 6:08
 "Now's the Time" (Charlie Parker) – 9:05
 "A Cool One" – 4:37
 "Jelly Roll" – 4:49
 "Playhouse March" (Ted Curson) – 5:23
 "Billie's Bounce" (Parker) – 3:04 Bonus track on reissue
 "Work Song" (Nat Adderley) – 5:03

Personnel 
Bill Barron, Booker Ervin – tenor saxophone
Kenny Barron – piano
Larry Ridley – bass
Andrew Cyrille – drums

References 

1964 albums
Savoy Records albums
Bill Barron (musician) albums